San Miguel, officially the Municipality of San Miguel,  is a 1st class municipality in the province of Bulacan, Philippines. According to the 2020 census, it has a population of 172,073 people.

It is the third largest municipality by area in the province after Doña Remedios Trinidad and Norzagaray.

Etymology
There are two accounts on the origin of the town's name:
 According to the 1953 journal History of Bulacan, the town was originally named Mayumo from the Kapampangan term for "sweets". The name San Miguel was added by the Augustinian missionaries who selected Michael the Archangel as the patron saint of the town.
 An account tells that the two leaders decided to form a town named Miguel De Mayumo after the name of Miguel Pineda and Mayumo, from the Kapampangan term and for the goodwill and generosity of Mariano Puno.

History

The municipality of San Miguel de Mayumo was established in 1763 by Carlos Agustin Maniquiz, Maria Juana Puno - wife of Carlos Agustin Maniquiz and Miguel Pineda, with Pineda as the first town mayor of San Miguel. Miguel Pineda was a native of Angat, Bulacan who decided to settle permanently in the barrio of San Bartolome (now named Barangay Tartaro). He found the place ideal for hunting and was later chosen as the leader of other settlers. He formed an alliance with Mariano Puno, the recognized leader of the adjacent prosperous village called Santo Rosario (now named Barangay Mandile).

The town was previously part of Pampanga, hence San Miguel's culture having Kapampangan influence. In 1848, the town and the neighbouring barrios, which were then part of Pampanga, were added to the territory of the Province of Bulacan.

The Pact of Biak-Na-Bato

During the Philippine Revolution in 1897, newly appointed Governor-General Fernando Primo de Rivera decided to crush Emilio Aguinaldo and his troops in Cavite, but Aguinaldo fled to Batangas and joined forces with Gen. Miguel Malvar. The Spaniards continue their pursuit but the troops outwitted them by going to the province of Morong (now Rizal) and finally to Biak-na-Bato in San Miguel, Bulacan. Aguinaldo made the mountain caves into his headquarters.

Biak-na-Bato (21.17 km2 in the villages of Kalawakan and Talbak in Doña Remedios Trinidad town and the villages of Biak-na-Bato and Sibul) served as one of the camps of the revolutionary Katipunan forces during the Philippine Revolution. It was declared a national park by Manuel L. Quezon on November 16, 1937, through Proclamation No. 223.

Japanese occupation
During World War II, Japanese Imperial ground troops entered and occupied the town municipality of San Miguel on 1942. Local Filipino troops of the Philippine Commonwealth Army and Philippine Constabulary units retreated into the nearby mountains to become the Bulakeño guerrilla resistance against the Japanese occupation forces until the province's liberation.

Recent History
San Miguel was the largest town in Bulacan until September 13, 1977, when Doña Remedios Trinidad, the current largest municipality of Bulacan, was established under Presidential Decree No. 1196 during the term of President Ferdinand Marcos.

On August 26, 2007, residents at the foot of the Biak-na-Bato mountains petitioned president Gloria Macapagal Arroyo to declare the mountains protected areas to stop marble quarrying and mining there.

Geography
The town of San Miguel is bounded by Nueva Ecija Province in the northernmost area, Pampanga Province in the west, the town is bounded by two provinces with land borders. The town of San Ildefonso, Bulacan lies next to San Miguel in the southernmost area, Doña Remedios Trinidad in the eastmost area which also borders San Rafael and Angat. San Miguel then was the biggest municipality in the province of Bulacan before some areas were taken and annexed to Doña Remedios Trinidad during the term of Ferdinand Marcos. The geographic nature of the town is diversified and multi-faceted, rich in nature's beauty like waterfall, rivers, caves, few mountains, hilly areas and springs. The mainland are plain agricultural lands, some part of which was substantially eroded due to commercialization and urbanization. 

Climate

The prevailing climatic conditions in the municipality is categorized into two types: Wet season and dry season.
 Wet Season - (Rainy season or Monsoon season) 
 Dry Season - (Summer season)

Barangays 

San Miguel is administratively subdivided into 49 barangays. Of these, 11 are considered urban and the rest rural.

Demographics

Languages
The municipality, along with two other municipalities (Remedios Trinidad and Norzagaray) and one city (San Jose del Monte), is the homeland of the Alta Kabulowan, the first inhabitants of Bulacan whose language is also called Alta Kabulowan. Their language is currently endangered due to an influx of Tagalog speakers.

Religion and Traditions 
Currently, San Miguel is divided into four parishes and a large number of visitas, all of which are under the jurisdiction of the Diocese of Malolos. These are Diocesan Shrine and Parish of San Miguel Arcangel located in Brgy. Poblacion; San Jose Esposo de Maria Parish located in Brgy. San Jose; Nuestra Señora delos Remedios Parish located in Brgy. Sibul Springs; and Sacred Heart of Jesus Parish located in Brgy. Salacot.

The traditions are very alive and well-preserved in San Miguel, as shown by the Holy Week processions in the mother church, which include about 60 carrozas. Numerous images of our Lord, the Blessed Mother, and saints, visited this church, such as the Nuestro Padre Jesus Nazareno of Quiapo and La Purisima Concepcion de Santa Maria. Every May 8th, San Miguel holds its town fiesta, and every September 29th, it celebrates its Pistang Patron celebration.

The tradition of Los Desposorios or the Bethrotal of Mary and Josephis very alive at San Jose Esposo de Maria Parish in Brgy. San Jose. The said parish celebrates its fiesta every 26th of November, the traditional date which the Augustinians celebrates the feast of the Bethrotal. It will start with Procesion de los Desposorios and after that, the antique image of Saint Joseph and Our Lady meets at the patio of the parish and the rite of the Renewal of Vows will be conducted.

Economy

Government

Elected officials
 Municipal Mayor: Roderick D. Tiongson (NUP)
 Municipal Vice Mayor: John "Bong" A. Alvarez (NUP)
Sangguniang Bayan Members:
 Gerome "Jhong" D. Reyes (NUP)
 Romeo C. Dizon (Reform PH-People's Party)
 Mary Joy Ann S. Chico (Reform PH-People's Party)
 Emmanuel "Emil" D. Magtalas (NUP)
 Anika Corinne "Nika" D. Santiago-Tan (NUP)
 Joseph Noel P. de Guzman (Reform PH-People's Party)
 Mark David "Bong" C. Maon (NUP)
 Jayvee C. Lacsina (NUP)
ABC President: Crisanto DG. Tiongson
Sangguniang Kabataan President: Pol David R. Buencamino

List of Gobernadorcillo

List of chief executives

Education

The town has numerous public schools offering elementary and high school education. Some of the elementary public schools are:
 San Miguel North Central School, in barangay Camias
 San Miguel South Central Elementary School, located in population center of the town

Some of the public high schools are:
 San Miguel National High School, located in barangay San Juan
 John J. Russel Memorial High School, located at Sibul
 Vedasto R. Santiago High School, located in barangay Salacot
 Partida High School, located at Partida
 Balaong High School, annex of San Miguel National High School, located at Barangay Balaong
 Maligaya High School, annex of Vedasto R. Santiago High School, located at Barangay Maligaya

Some of the private schools offering elementary and pre-elementary education are:
 D. C. Nicolas School, located in barangay Tigpalas
 Park Ridge School of Montessori, located in barangay Camias
 Saint Paul University at San Miguel, located in barangay Salangan
 School of Mount St. Mary, located in barangay Santa Rita (New)
 Waminal Achievers Academy, Incorporated, located in population center of the town
 God's Love Children's Advancement Center, location in Santa Rita (Old)

Some of the tertiary schools are:
 Bulacan Polytechnic College (San Miguel Campus) in barangay Salacot
 Integrated College of Business and Technology at barangay Salangan
 Saint Paul University at San Miguel, located in barangay Salangan
 Microlink Institute of Science and Technology (San Miguel Campus) in barangay Camias

Notable people

 Nicanor Abelardo - Kundiman composer.
 Virgilio S. Almario - National Artist for Literature. Poet, critic, translator, editor, teacher, cultural manager, and the founder of Adarna House.
 Felipe Buencamino - Former Secretary of Foreign Affairs and one of the founders of Iglesia Filipina Independiente. One of the authors of the Malolos Constitution
 Alfredo Lim – Former Philippine Senator, then Mayor of Manila and former Director of the National Bureau of Investigation.
 Pablo Tecson – Former Governor General of Bulacan and later served as Insular Secretary of the Philippine Bureau of Agriculture.
 Emiliano Tecson – Participated in the ratification of the first Philippine Constitution with Emilio Aguinaldo.
 Simon Tecson – Filipino General who served as revolutionary Colonel of the Siege of Baler. Former mayor of San Miguel, Bulacan.
 Trinidad Tecson – One of the renowned female revolutionaries of the Philippine Revolution. Known as the Mother of Biak-na-Bato. Also known as 'The Mother of Philippine Red Cross' and 'Mother of Mercy'.
 Maximo Viola - Doctor, revolutionary, and initial financier of the publication of Jose Rizal's novel Noli me tangere (novel)
 Carlos A. Santos-Viola – Filipino architect. Best known for designing and building churches for the Iglesia ni Cristo religious group.
 Pablo Payawal - Congressman, House of Representative, 2nd District of Bulacan.  (1934-1935)
 Narcisa Buencamino-de Leon - One of the founders of LVN Pictures, one of the biggest film studios in the history of Philippine Cinema
 Von Lazaro - New York-based Laundromat Personnel
 Magtanggol C. Gunigundo - chairman, Presidential Commission on Good Government (PCGG) from 1992 to 1998; and Constitutional Convention Delegate representing the 2nd District of Bulacan, 1971 Constitutional Convention

References

External links

 [ Philippine Standard Geographic Code]
 Philippine Census Information

 
Municipalities of Bulacan
Populated places established in 1763
1763 establishments in the Philippines
Spa towns in the Philippines